The WCWA Texas Tag Team Championship was the secondary professional wrestling tag team championship promoted by the Dallas–Fort Worth metroplex area-basedWorld Class Wrestling Association (WCWA). The championship was originally known as the NWA Texas Tag Team Championship from its creation in 1942 until 1981. The championship was revived in 1987 as the WCWA Texas Tag Team Championship, and used until 1990, when it was abandoned as WCWA was merged with the Continental Wrestling Association (CWA) to become the United States Wrestling Association.  The name was also used for a title by NWA Southwest from 1998 to 2011, also known as the NWA Southwest Texas Tag Team Championship. As it is a professional wrestling championship, it is won not by actual competition, but by a scripted ending to a match.

The first time a championship was promoted as the "Texas Tag Team Championship" was in 1943 when records indicate that Ellis Bashara and Angelo Cistoldi won the championship. The Texas Tag Team Championship was not mentioned again until 1945 in what would later become the National Wrestling Alliance's East Texas territory. By 1950 it was promoted by Southwest Sports and was officially recognized by the NWA. The first champions recognized by the NWA was the team of Rito Romero and Miguel Guzmán. In 1966, Fritz Von Erich bought Southwest Sports and renamed it NWA Big Time Wrestling. In the 1981 the championship was abandoned, with Raul Mata and Billy White Wolf as the last champions at the time. The Texas Tag Team Championship was brought back in 1987, with Big Time Wrestling now known as World Class Wrestling Association. The first WCWA Texas Tag Team Champions were Tony Atlas and Skip Young, who won a one-night single elimination tag team tournament to claim the championship. When WCWA merged with the Tennessee based CWA the title was abandoned, with Steve and Shaun Simpson as the last holders of the championship. In 2012 NWA Wrecking Ball Wrestling reactivated the NWA Texas titles. 

The team of Duke Keomuka and Danny Savich won the championship on six occasions, the most of any team. Keomuka won the championship a total of 16 times, in addition to teaming with Savich he also won it with Ivan Kalmikoff, Mr. Moto, Don Evans, Tiny Mills, Kinji Shibuya, Tony Martin, Tokyo Joe, John Tolos, and Maurice Vachon. In 1950, Killer Kowalski defeated Keomuka and Savich in a handicap match, to become the only wrestler to hold the tag team championship singled handedly. Romero and Guzmán's reign from March 3 until November 30, 1950 is the longest confirmed reign of any championship team, a total of 272 days. Based on recorded history there were 153 individual reigns between 1943 and 1989, possibly more since there are periods of time where the championship history is unrecorded.

Title history

Championship tournaments

NWA Texas Tag Team Championship Tournament (1952)
The NWA Texas Tag Team Tournament was a one-night single elimination tag team tournament held in Fort Worth, Texas on December 1, 1952, for the vacant NWA Texas Tag Team Championship.

NWA Texas Tag Team Championship Tournament (1967)
The NWA Texas Tag Team Tournament was a one-night single elimination tag team tournament held in San Antonio, Texas on May 3, 1967, for the vacant NWA Texas Tag Team Championship.

NWA Texas Tag Team Championship Tournament (1978)
The NWA Texas Tag Team Tournament was a one-night single elimination tag team tournament held in Fort Worth, Texas on October 30, 1978, for the vacant NWA Texas Tag Team Championship.

WCCW Texas Tag Team Championship Tournament (1987)
The WCCW Texas Tag Team Tournament was a one-night single elimination tag team tournament held in Fort Worth, Texas on June 29, 1987, for the vacant WCCW Texas Tag Team Championship.

See also
List of National Wrestling Alliance championships

Footnotes

References

World Class Championship Wrestling championships
Tag team wrestling championships
Professional wrestling in Texas
State professional wrestling championships